Javed Iqbal Mughal (1956 – 8 October 2001) was a Pakistani serial killer and pederast who confessed to the sexual abuse and murder of 100 young boys, ranging in age from 6 to 16. Iqbal strangled the victims, dismembered the corpses and dissolved them in acid as a way to conceal the evidence. He was found guilty and sentenced to death in the same manner that he killed the boys, being strangled first, then cut into a hundred pieces, in front of the parents of the victims, one piece for each victim, then be dissolved into acid; Interior Minister, Moinuddin Haider, stated that such a punishment would not be allowed. Iqbal died by suicide before any sentence could be carried out.

Early life

Iqbal was born to a Muslim Mughal family, and he was the sixth of eight children of his businessman father. He attended Government Islamia College, Railway Road Lahore as an intermediate student. In 1978, while still a student, he started a steel recasting business. Iqbal lived, along with boys, in a villa in Shadbagh which his father had purchased for him.

Murders
In December 1999, Iqbal sent a letter to police and a Lahore newspaper chief news editor Khawar Naeem Hashmi confessing to the rape and murder of 100 runaway boys, all aged between 6 and 16. In the letter, he claimed to have strangled and dismembered the victims, mostly runaways and orphans living on the streets of Lahore and disposed of their bodies using vats of hydrochloric acid. He then dumped the remains in a local river.

Inside Iqbal's house, police and reporters found bloodstains on the walls and floor, along with the chain with which Iqbal claimed to have strangled his victims and photographs of many of his victims in plastic bags. These items were neatly labelled with handwritten pamphlets. Two vats of acid with partially dissolved human remains were also left in the open for police to find, with a note claiming the bodies in the house have deliberately not been disposed of so that authorities will find them.<ref name=SMcG>McGraw, Seamus. "A Letter from a Killer." All about Javed Iqbal. Crime Library p.  (Archive).</ref>

Iqbal confessed in his letter that he planned to drown himself in the Ravi River following his crimes, but, after unsuccessfully dragging the river with nets, police launched the largest manhunt in Pakistani history. Four accomplices, teenage boys who had shared Iqbal's three-bedroom flat, were arrested in Sohawa. Within days, one of them died in police custody, with a post-mortem suggesting that force had been used against him; allegedly, he jumped from a window.

Iqbal's motive for committing his murders was his infuriation at a perceived injustice at the hands of Lahore police who had arrested him on charges relating to an act of sodomy against a young runaway boy in the 1990s. No charges were brought in relation to this offence. His mother had "been forced to watch [his] decline" before suffering a fatal heart attack. He had therefore resolved to make 100 mothers cry for their sons as his mother had been forced to do for him before her death.

Trial and sentencing
It was a month before Iqbal turned himself in at the offices of the Daily Jang on 30 December 1999. He was subsequently arrested. He stated that he had surrendered to the newspaper because he feared for his life and was concerned that the police would kill him.

Iqbal was sentenced to death; the judge passed the sentence saying, "You will be strangled to death in front of the parents whose children you killed, your body will then be cut into 100 pieces and put in acid, the same way you killed the children." The Interior Minister, Moinuddin Haider, contradicted the sentence by stating that Pakistan is a signatory of the Human Rights Commission, so "such punishments are not allowed."

Death
On October 9, 2001, Iqbal and Sajid Ahmad, one of his accomplices, were found dead in their respective cells at the Kot Lakhpat Jail. Despite indications that both had been murdered, the deaths were officially ruled as suicides. Iqbal's body went unclaimed. 

In popular cultureJaved Iqbal: The Untold Story of A Serial Killer is a 2022 Pakistani film that was set to be released on 28 January, 2022. The film was, however, banned by the Punjab government and the Central Board of Film Censors and pulled out of the theatres a day before its release. The film is directed by Abu Aleeha with Yasir Hussain in the role of the notorious serial killer.

 See also 
 List of serial killers by country
 List of serial killers by number of victims
 Huang Yong (murderer)
 Dennis Nilsen

References

Further reading
 "LAHORE: Javed Iqbal, accomplice found dead in jail." Dawn. Updated 10 October 2001.
 McCarthy, Rory. "Killer's sentence: cut into 100 pieces". The Guardian. Thursday 16 March 2000.
 "Pakistan probes serial killer's death." BBC. Wednesday 10 October 2001.
 "Pakistan 'serial killer' under interrogation." BBC. Friday 31 December 1999.

External links
 McGraw, Seamus. . Crime Library''.

1956 births
2001 deaths
2001 suicides
Criminals from Lahore
Male serial killers
Pakistani people convicted of child sexual abuse
Pakistani people convicted of murder
Pakistani people convicted of rape
Pakistani murderers of children
Pakistani prisoners sentenced to death
Pakistani serial killers
People convicted of murder by Pakistan
Prisoners sentenced to death by Pakistan
Serial killers who committed suicide in prison custody
Suicides by hanging in Pakistan
Violence against men in Asia